The 2023 PokerGO Cup was the third iteration of the PokerGO Cup, a series of high-stakes poker tournaments as part of the PokerGO Tour. It was held from inside the PokerGO Studio at Aria Resort & Casino in Las Vegas, Nevada. The series took place from January 11-20, 2023, with eight scheduled events culminating in a $50,000 No-Limit Hold'em tournament.

The player who earns the most points throughout the series would be crowned the PokerGO Cup champion earning the PokerGO Cup and winning the $50,000 championship bonus.

Every final table was streamed on OTT service PokerGO.

The Main Event was won by American Isaac Haxton, and the PokerGO Cup was awarded to American Cary Katz.

Schedule

Series leaderboard 
The 2023 PokerGO Cup will award the PokerGO Cup to the player that accumulates the most PokerGO Tour points during the series, as well as the $50,000 championship bonus. American Cary Katz cashed five times on his way to accumulating $655,800 in winnings. Katz accumulated 460 points and was awarded the PokerGO Cup.

Results

Event #1: $10,000 No-Limit Hold'em 

 2-Day Event: January 11-12, 2023
 Number of Entries: 90
 Total Prize Pool: $900,000
 Number of Payouts: 13
 Winning Hand:

Event #2: $10,000 No-Limit Hold'em 

 2-Day Event: January 12-13, 2023
 Number of Entries: 83
 Total Prize Pool: $830,000
 Number of Payouts: 12
 Winning Hand:

Event #3: $10,000 No-Limit Hold'em 

 2-Day Event: January 13-14, 2023
 Number of Entries: 90
 Total Prize Pool: $900,000
 Number of Payouts: 13
 Winning Hand:

Event #4: $10,000 No-Limit Hold'em 

 2-Day Event: January 14 and 16, 2023
 Number of Entries: 78
 Total Prize Pool: $780,000
 Number of Payouts: 12
 Winning Hand:

Event #5: $15,000 No-Limit Hold'em 

 2-Day Event: January 16-17, 2023
 Number of Entries: 56
 Total Prize Pool: $840,000
 Number of Payouts: 8
 Winning Hand:

Event #6: $25,000 No-Limit Hold'em 

 2-Day Event: January 17-18, 2023
 Number of Entries: 50
 Total Prize Pool: $1,250,000
 Number of Payouts: 8
 Winning Hand:

Event #7: $25,000 No-Limit Hold'em 

 2-Day Event: January 18-19, 2023
 Number of Entries: 31
 Total Prize Pool: $775,000
 Number of Payouts: 5
 Winning Hand:

Event #8: $50,000 No-Limit Hold'em 

 2-Day Event: January 19-20, 2023
 Number of Entries: 26
 Total Prize Pool: $1,300,000
 Number of Payouts: 4
 Winning Hand:

References

External links 

 Results

2023 in sports in Nevada
Television shows about poker
Poker tournaments
2023 in poker